Scott Deibert (born October 2, 1970) is a former Canadian football fullback who played eight seasons in the Canadian Football League (CFL) with the Edmonton Eskimos, Winnipeg Blue Bombers and Calgary Stampeders. He was drafted by the Edmonton Eskimos in the third round of the 1998 CFL Draft. He played college football at Minot State University.

College career
Deibert attended Minot State University from 1994 to 1998. He was a four-year letterman in football and a three-year letterman in track and field for the Minot State Beavers. He was also a four-time All-Conference section in football and rushed for 1,036 yards in 1994. The Beavers were the NDCAC champions in 1994. Deibert was the 1998 NDCAC indoor track champion in the 55 meter dash. He was inducted into the Minot State University Athletics Hall of Fame in 2006.

Professional career
Deibert was selected by the Edmonton Eskimos of the CFL with the 17th pick in the 1998 CFL Draft and played in 34 games for the team from 1998 to 1999. He was released by the Eskimos on July 1, 2000. He signed with the CFL's Winnipeg Blue Bombers on July 3, 2000 and played in seventeen games, starting five, for the team during the 2000 season. Deibert was released by the Blue Bombers in December 2000. He was signed by the Calgary Stampeders of the CFL in April 2001 and played in 80 games for the team from 2001 to 2005. The Stampeders won the 89th Grey Cup against the Winnipeg Blue Bombers on November 25, 2001. He retired in January 2006.

References

External links
Just Sports Stats

Living people
1970 births
Canadian football fullbacks
American football fullbacks
Canadian players of American football
Minot State Beavers football players
Edmonton Elks players
Winnipeg Blue Bombers players
Calgary Stampeders players
Canadian male sprinters
College men's track and field athletes in the United States
Players of Canadian football from Saskatchewan
Sportspeople from Moose Jaw